Victor Olaotan (17 February 1952 – 26 August 2021) was a Nigerian actor best known in his leading role of the soap opera Tinsel.

Early life and education 
He was born in Lagos, Nigeria, in 1952. He studied at the University of Ibadan, Obafemi Awolowo University , and Rockets University, United States.

Career 
He began his career as an actor when he joined the University of Ibadan theatre group, where he met other artists, such as Professor Wole Soyinka and Jimi Solanke among others.
He became an actor at the age of 15 years through a teacher who was a member of the Ori Olokun Theatre group in the early 70s, prior to the death of his father.
After his father died, he traveled to the United States in 1978 but returned to Nigeria in 2002 to continue his career in acting. He became more popular in 2013 after his leading role in the Nigerian soap opera Tinsel which began airing in August 2008. The veteran actor was involved in a motor accident in October 2016 and suffered a nervous system injury. He was driving to a movie set when the accident took place around Apple Junction, in Festac, Lagos.

Death 
Olaotan died on 26 August 2021 aged 69 due to a brain injury caused by the car accident he was involved in October 2016.

Filmography 
Tinsel – Fred Ade-Williams (2008–2013)
Towo Tomo (2013)
Lovestruck
Three Wise Men

See also
 List of Nigerian actors

References 

1952 births
2021 deaths
Yoruba male actors
Nigerian male television actors
University of Ibadan alumni
20th-century Nigerian male actors
21st-century Nigerian male actors
Male actors from Lagos
Nigerian expatriates in the United States
Obafemi Awolowo University alumni
Male actors in Yoruba cinema